The 2018 Men's Volleyball Kor Royal Cup was the latest edition of the Men's Volleyball Kor Royal Cup, the tournament patronized by Princess Maha Chakri Sirindhorn, The Princess Royal of Thailand for men's senior volleyball clubs, also known as 2018 Sealect Tuna Men's Senior Volleyball Kor Royal Cup Thailand Championship due to the sponsorship deal with Sealect Tuna. A total of 6 teams will compete in the tournament.

Teams

Round robin
All times are Indochina Time (UTC+07:00).

Standing procedure
 Number of matches won
 Match points
 Sets ratio
 Points ratio
 If the tie continues as per the point ratio between two teams, the priority will be given to the team which won the last match between them. When the tie in points ratio is between three or more teams, a new classification of these teams in the terms of points 1, 2 and 3 will be made taking into consideration only the matches in which they were opposed to each other.
Match won 3–0 or 3–1: 3 match points for the winner, 0 match points for the loser
Match won 3–2: 2 match points for the winner, 1 match point for the loser

Standing

|}

|}

Final standings

References

2018 in men's volleyball
Volleyball competitions in Thailand